The 27th East Bosnia Division was a Yugoslav Partisan division that fought against the Germans, Independent State of Croatia (NDH) and Chetniks in occupied Yugoslavia during World War II. 

As part of the Partisan 3rd Corps it spent most of 1944 engaged in hard fighting against the 13th Waffen Mountain Division of the SS Handschar (1st Croatian) in eastern Bosnia.

Notes

References
 
 

Divisions of the Yugoslav Partisans
Military units and formations established in 1944
Military units and formations disestablished in 1945